1997 Uganda Cup was the 23rd season of the main Ugandan football Cup.

Overview
The competition was known as the Kakungulu Cup and was won by Express Red Eagles who beat Uganda Electricity Board FC 4-1 in the final.  The results are not available for the earlier rounds

Final

Footnotes

External links
 Uganda - List of Cup Finals - RSSSF (Mikael Jönsson, Ian King and Hans Schöggl)

Ugandan Cup
Uganda Cup
Cup